The Lion Tower is a small fortress located at the far eastern end of the Tripoli harbor in North Lebanon. The tower was named after the relief decorations depicting lions that used to line the façade. The structure dates back to the end of the fifteenth century and is attributed to Mameluke Sultan Qaitbay.

The tower is considered an exceptional example of military Mameluke architecture.  Its portico is adorned with stripes of black and white ashlar stones, and ancient Roman columns were laid down horizontally to reinforce the tower's wall.  The ground floor is one single large room that was decorated with armorial carvings and paintings, traces of which can still be seen.

References

External links
 Qantara Mediterranean Heritage – Lion Tower

Towers completed in the 15th century
Archaeological sites in Lebanon
Castles in Lebanon
Tripoli, Lebanon
Mamluk architecture in Lebanon